The 2018 Coupe du Togo is the 2018 edition of the Coupe du Togo, the knockout football competition of Togo.

First round

Région de Lomé

[Mar 17]

Entente II FC (Lomé)	 	    0-0 Etoile Filante FC (Lomé)		[4-3 pen]

[Mar 18]

Centre de Formation AAFA 	    2-2 AS OTR (Lomé)				[4-1 pen]

OC Agaza FC (Lomé)	 	    0-2 Dynamic Togolais FC (Lomé)

AS Togo-Port (Lomé)		    bye

Région Maritime

[Mar 17]

Olympique Football Club (Vo) 	    2-3 Espoir Football Club de Zio (Tsévié)

Gbohloé-su des Lacs FC (Aného)      bye

Région des Plateaux

[Mar 17]

Okiti FC (Badou)		    1-0 Anges FC (Notsè)

Adjiri FC 		 	    0-1 Kotoko FC (Laviè)

[Mar 18]

Ifodjè FC d'Atakpamé		    0-0 Gomido FC (Kpalimé)			[2-4 pen]

Maranatha FC de Fiokpo (Womé)	    bye

Région Centrale
[Mar 17]

US Koroki Metete FC (Tchamba)	    1-0 Unisport FC (Sokodé)

[Mar 18]

Tchaoudjo Athletic Club FC (Sokodé) 1-1 Agouwa FC (Koussountou)			[5-4 pen]

Odalou FC (Kambolé)		    0-0 AC Sèmassi FC (Sokodé)			[2-4 pen]

Kpandi Junior			    bye

Région de la Kara
[Mar 17]

Open de Wagandè			    2-2 ASKO FC (Kara)				[3-5 pen]

[Mar 18]

Sara Sport FC (Bafilo)	 	    1-1 ASC Kara				[4-5 pen]

AS Binah (Pagouda)	 	    0-2 Gbikinti FC (Bassar)

Région des Savanes
[Mar 18]

Mosaïque FC		 	    0-3 Foadan FC (Dapaong)

Second round

Région de Lomé/Région Maritime
[Apr 11]

Dynamic Togolais FC (Lomé)	    0-0 Centre de Formation AAFA		[3-2 pen]

Entente II FC (Lomé)		    0-1 Espoir Football Club de Zio (Tsévié)

[Apr 12]

AS Togo-Port (Lomé)		    1-0 Gbohloé-su des Lacs FC (Aného)

Région des Plateaux
[Apr 11]

Gomido FC (Kpalimé)		    1-0 Okiti FC (Badou)

[Apr 12]

Maranatha FC de Fiokpo (Womé)	    2-1 Kotoko FC (Laviè)

Région Centrale
[Apr 11]

AC Sèmassi FC (Sokodé)		    2-1 US Koroki Metete FC (Tchamba)

[Apr 12]

Kpandi Junior			    1-3 Tchaoudjo Athletic Club FC (Sokodé)

Région de la Kara/Région des Savanes
[Apr 11]

ASC Kara			    3-0 Gbikinti FC (Bassar)

[Apr 12]

Foadan FC (Dapaong)		    1-1 ASKO FC (Kara)				[11-10 pen]

NB: ASKO FC (Kara) qualified as lucky loser.

Third round
[May 9]

AS Togo-Port (Lomé)		    1-0 Espoir Football Club de Zio (Tsévié)

Dynamic Togolais FC (Lomé)	    1-0 Tchaoudjo Athletic Club FC (Sokodé)

Gomido FC (Kpalimé)		    1-0 Maranatha FC de Fiokpo (Womé)

ASC Kara			    1-2 Foadan FC (Dapaong)

AC Sèmassi FC (Sokodé)		    3-1 ASKO FC (Kara)

NB: ASC Kara qualified as lucky loser.

Fourth round
[May 23]

Foadan FC (Dapaong)		    0-1 Gomido FC (Kpalimé)

ASC Kara			    1-0 AS Togo-Port (Lomé)

Dynamic Togolais FC (Lomé)	    2-1 AC Sèmassi FC (Sokodé)

NB: AC Sèmassi FC (Sokodé) qualified as lucky loser.

Semi-finals
[May 30]

Dynamic Togolais FC (Lomé)	    0-0 ASC Kara				[9-8 pen]

Gomido FC (Kpalimé)		    1-1 AC Sèmassi FC (Sokodé)			[3-0 pen]

Final
[Jun 9,  Stade Municipal, Lomé]

Gomido FC (Kpalimé)		    3-0 Dynamic Togolais FC (Lomé)

See also
2017–18 Togolese Championnat National

References

Togo
Cup
Football competitions in Togo